The following is a list of the governors, commodore-governors, and lieutenant governors of Newfoundland and Labrador. Though the present day office of the lieutenant governor in Newfoundland and Labrador came into being only upon the province's entry into Canadian Confederation in 1949, the post is a continuation from the first governorship of Newfoundland in 1610.

Proprietary governors of Newfoundland, 1610–1728

Governors of Plaisance, 1655–1713

Lieutenant-governors of Placentia, 1713–1770

Commodore-governors of Newfoundland, 1729–1825
The Commodore-Governor was a British Royal Navy official who was commander of the annual fishing convoy which left England each spring to fish off Newfoundland and was charged with protecting the convoys from harm. He was also responsible for various administrative and judicial functions, including assisting the fishing admirals in maintaining law and order and compiling the annual report on the fishery for the English government. By 1818,  the colony had a significant enough permanent population to justify having a resident governor.

Civil governors of Newfoundland, 1825–1855

Colonial governors of Newfoundland, 1855–1907

Governors of the Dominion of Newfoundland, 1907–1934

Commission governors of Newfoundland, 1934–1949

Lieutenant governors of Newfoundland, 1949–1999

Lieutenant governors of Newfoundland and Labrador, 1999–present

See also
 Office-holders of Canada
 Canadian incumbents by year

Notes

References

External links
 

Newfoundland and Labrador

Governors

Gov